Renaissance Island may refer to:

Renaissance Island, Aruba
Vozrozhdeniya island in the Aral Sea